{{Infobox artist
| honorific_prefix = Raden 
| name = Saleh Syarif Bustaman
| native_name = 
| image = Portrait of Raden Saleh c. 1872.jpg
| caption = Raden Saleh in  1872
| birth_name = Saleh Sjarif Boestaman
| birth_date =  1811
| birth_place = Semarang, Dutch East Indies
| death_date = 
| death_place = Buitenzorg, Dutch East Indies
| field = Painting, drawing
| movement = Romanticism
| works = {{plain list|
The Arrest of Pangeran DiponegoroDeer HuntView of Erupting Mount Merapi}}
}}

Raden Saleh Sjarif Boestaman (EYD: Raden Saleh Syarif Bustaman;  1811 – 23 April 1880)Raden Saleh: The Romantic Aristocrat was a pioneering Indonesian Romantic painter of Arab-Javanese ethnicity. He was considered to be the first "modern" artist from Indonesia (then the Dutch East Indies), and his paintings corresponded with nineteenth-century romanticism which was popular in Europe at the time. He also expressed his cultural roots and inventiveness in his work.

Early life
Raden Saleh Syarif Bustaman was born in 1811 in the village of Terboyo, near Semarang on the island of Java in the Dutch East Indies (present-day Indonesia). He was born into a noble Hadhrami family;  his father was Sayyid Husen bin Alwi bin Awal bin Yahya, whose family had come to Java via Surat in India in the seventeenth century. He was the grandson of Sayyid Abdullah Bustam through his mother, Raden Ayu Sarif Husen bin Alwi bin Awal.  Through his sister, Roqayah, Raden Saleh was uncle by marriage to the famous religious leader Habib Ali Kwitang.

Travel to Europe

Young Raden Saleh was first taught in Bogor by the Belgian artist A.J. Payen. Payen acknowledged the youth's talent, and persuaded the colonial government of the Netherlands to send Raden Saleh to the Netherlands to study art. He arrived in Europe in 1829 and began to study under Cornelius Kruseman and Andreas Schelfhout.

It was from Kruseman that Raden Saleh studied his skills in portraiture, and later was accepted at various European courts where he was assigned to do portraits. While in Europe, in 1836 Saleh became the first indigenous Indonesian to be initiated into Freemasonry. From 1839, he spent five years at the court of Ernest I, Duke of Saxe-Coburg and Gotha, who became an important patron.

From Schelfhout, Raden Saleh furthered his skills as a landscape painter. Raden Saleh visited several European cities, as well as Algiers. In The Hague, a lion tamer allowed Raden Saleh to study his lion, and from that his most famous painting of animal fights was created, which subsequently brought fame to the artist. Many of his paintings were exhibited at the Rijksmuseum in Amsterdam. Several of his paintings were destroyed when the Colonial Dutch pavilion in Paris was burnt in 1931.

Return to the Dutch East Indies

Raden Saleh returned to Dutch East Indies in 1852, after living in Europe for 20 years. He worked as conservator for the colonial collection of government art, and acted as court painter to the Governors-General. He also painted portraits of members of the colonial elite – European administrators, the Javanese priyayi or the Peranakan Chinese 'Cabang Atas' – as well as landscapes. Returning to Java, he expressed his uneasiness of living in the colonies, stating that "here, people only talks about coffee and sugar, then sugar and coffee" in one of his letters.

Upon returning, he married a wealthy Indo heiress of part-German extraction, Constancia von Mansfeld. His new wife financed the construction of Saleh's landhuis or country house on the private domain (particuliere land) that the couple had acquired, Cikini. Saleh's house was inspired architecturally by Callenberg Castle where he had stayed during his European travels  1844. Surrounded by vast grounds, most of them were converted into public gardens in 1862, and were closed in the turn of the century. In 1960, the Taman Ismail Marzuki was built in the former gardens. The house itself is still used today as a PGI Cikini Hospital building.

On his first wife's death, Saleh remarried to a young aristocratic woman of Yogyakarta Sultanate, Raden Ayu Danudirdja, in 1867 and subsequently moved to Bogor, where he rented a house near the Bogor Botanical Gardens with a view of Mount Salak. He later took his wife to travel in Europe, visiting countries such as the Netherlands, France, Germany, and Italy. His wife however contracted an illness while in Paris, the exact illness is still not known, and was so severe that they both immediately returned to Bogor. She died on 31 July 1880, following her husband's death three months earlier.

Death
On Friday morning, 23 April, 1880, Saleh suddenly fell sick. He claimed that he was poisoned by one of his servants, and subsequently died; however post-mortem examination showed that his circulatory system was disrupted due to a clot near his heart. Saleh was buried two days later in Kampung Empang, Bogor. As reported in Javanese Bode newspaper, 28 April 1880, his funeral was "attended by various landheeren [landlords] and Dutch officials, and even by curious students from nearby school."

Painting
During his stay in Paris, Saleh met Horace Vernet whose painting frequently took themes of African wildlife. Compared to Vernet, Saleh's painting seems to be more influenced by the romantic painter Eugène Delacroix. This could be seen in one of Saleh's work, Hunting Lion, 1840, which has similar composition to Delacroix's Liberty Leading the People. However, Werner Kraus, a researcher in the Southeast-Asian Art Center of Passau, Germany, said that Saleh "never mentioned Delacroix. Perhaps he saw Delacroix's, and possibly Vernet's, works during an exhibition."

The Arrest of Pangeran Diponegoro

Raden Saleh is particularly remembered for his historical painting, The Arrest of Pangeran Diponegoro, which depicted the betrayal of the rebel leader Prince Diponegoro by the colonial government, thus ending the Java War in 1830. The Prince was tricked into entering Dutch custody near Magelang, believing he was there for negotiations of a possible cease-fire. He was captured through treachery and later deported.

The event had been previously painted by a Dutch painter Nicolaas Pieneman, commissioned by Lieutenant General Hendrik Merkus de Kock. It is thought that Saleh saw this painting during his stay in Europe. Saleh made significant changes in his version of the painting; Pieneman painted the scene from the right, Saleh from the left. Pieneman depicts Diponegoro with resigned expression, while in Saleh's he appears to be outraged. Pieneman gave his painting the title Submission of Prince Diponegoro, while Saleh gave The Arrest of Pangeran Diponegoro. It is known that Saleh deliberately painted Diponegoro's Dutch captors with large heads to make them appear monstrous, as opposed to the more proportionally depicted Javanese.

Raden Saleh’s work has been regarded as a sign of incipient nationalism in what was then the Dutch East Indies. This can also be seen it the depiction of Diponegoro's men. Pieneman had never been to the Indies, and so depicted Diponegoro's men in a more Arabic fashion. Saleh's version has a more accurate depiction of native Javanese clothing, with some figures wearing batik and blangkon.

Saleh finished this painting in 1857 and presented it to Willem III of Netherlands in The Hague. It was returned to Indonesia in 1978 as a realization of a cultural agreement between the two countries in 1969, regarding the return of cultural items which were taken, lent, or exchanged to the Dutch in the previous eras. Even though the painting did not fall under any of those categories, because Saleh presented it to the King of the Netherlands and it was never in the possession of Indonesia, it was nevertheless returned as a gift from the Royal Palace of Amsterdam, and is currently displayed at the Merdeka Palace Museum in Jakarta.

Works

See also
Habib Ali Kwitang

References

Further reading

Karnadi, Koes (editor) 2006)  Modern Indonesian art : from Raden Saleh to the present day '' introduction by Suwarno Wisetrotomo; with contributions by Agung Hujatnikajennong ... [et al.] Denpasar : Koes Artbooks.

External links

1807 births
1880 deaths
People from Semarang
Javanese people
Romantic painters
19th-century Indonesian painters
Indonesian people of Yemeni descent
Hashemite people
Indonesian Freemasons
Priyayi
Indonesian people of Arab descent